The 1961 Vanderbilt Commodores football team represented Vanderbilt University in the 1961 NCAA University Division football season. The Commodores were led by head coach Art Guepe in his ninth season and finished the season with a record of two wins and eight losses (2–8 overall, 1–6 in the SEC).

Schedule

Source: 1961 Vanderbilt football schedule

References

Vanderbilt
Vanderbilt Commodores football seasons
Vanderbilt Commodores football